Justine Henin was the defending champion, but withdrew due to a virus.

Lindsay Davenport won the title, defeating Anastasia Myskina 6–1, 6–1 in the final.

Seeds
The first eight seeds received a bye into the second round.

Draw

Finals

Top half

Section 1

Section 2

Bottom half

Section 3

Section 4

External links
 Main and Qualifying draws

Acura Classic - Singles
Southern California Open
Azura Classic - Singles